Charles Rieu aka. Charloun Rieu (1 November 1846 - 10 January 1924) was a French farmer and poet. The French sculptor Louis Botinelly created a monument that commemorates his life.

He was buried in Le Paradou.

See also

List of works by Louis Botinelly

External links

 Webpage about Charloun Rieu 
 Tomb of Charloun Rieu in Le Paradou 

1846 births
1924 deaths
French farmers
19th-century French poets
20th-century French poets
French male poets
19th-century French male writers
20th-century French male writers
19th-century farmers